Lee Boardman (born 2 July 1972) is an English actor and narrator. He has appeared in the films Jack the Giant Slayer and Love's Kitchen, and the television series Rome.

Career
Boardman played Murray Priestman in Drop Dead Gorgeous as well as the drug dealer Jez Quigley in Coronation Street. He appears as Timon the Jew in the television series Rome. He also made an appearance in the fifth episode of the 2011 BBC crime-drama series Death in Paradise. In 2013 he starred in the ITV1 comedy drama series Great Night Out as Hodge. In 2014 he played the recurring character of Amerigo Vespucci in Da Vinci's Demons.

In 2006, Lee starred in the film Fated.

He was also the narrator of popular Sky 1 police documentary Road Wars and its spin off Street Wars.
 
His BBC series Drop Dead Gorgeous won Best Comedy Drama at the British Comedy Awards 2008.

Personal life
Born in Stockport, England, in 1972, Boardman studied at Stockport College prior to winning a scholarship to the Oxford School of Drama. In 2001 he married his former Coronation Street co-star Jennifer James. They have two children; a son born in 2004 and a daughter born 2010.

Actor Tribe 
In 2013, Boardman and James launched Actor Tribe, an acting school for children and adults in Knutsford. The courses focus on the complexities of being a working actor through guest tutors who are professional actors themselves. Due to the success of the program, an additional school in Heaton Mersey was opened in 2016, with Boardman and his wife, Jennifer, dividing their time between the two locations.

Filmography

Television

Film

Narrator

Video games

References

External links

1972 births
Male actors from Manchester
English male television actors
Living people
People from Stockport
British male film actors
British male television actors
20th-century British male actors
21st-century British male actors